Santo is a masculine given name which may refer to:

 Santo Condorelli (born 1995), Italian swimmer
 Santo Farina, of the rock and roll duo Santo & Johnny
 Santo Jeger (1898–1953), British politician
 Santo Loquasto (born 1944), American production, set and costume designer
 Santo Mazzarino (1916–1987), Italian historian
 Santo Santoro (born 1956), Australian politician
 Santo Stephens (born 1969), American football player
 Santo Trafficante Jr. (1914–1987), American Mafia boss, head of the Trafficante crime family
 Santo Trafficante Sr. (1886–1954), Sicilian-born mobster, father of the above
 Santo Versace (born 1944), Italian businessman and politician

Masculine given names